Colossus are an American Christian metal band from Sioux Falls, South Dakota. The band started making music in 2010. Facedown Records signed the band. Time & Eternal is the first work by Colossus. Their second work is Badlands.

Background 

The band derives their name from the X-Men, Colossus.

Members 
Current
 Alex Gutzmer — lead vocals (2010-present)
 Jim Hughes — guitar, backing vocals (2010-present)
 Zach Moll — bass (2010-present)
 Israel Wipf — drums (2010-present)

Former
 Cameron Brooks — guitar (2010-2013)

Discography 
Studio albums

Singles
 "In the End", originally performed by Linkin Park, released on Goes Undercover compilation (2013)

References 

Facedown Records artists